Chrystal is an American drama film, which was released to audiences in the United States on April 8, 2005. The cast included Billy Bob Thornton, Lisa Blount, Harry Lennix, Walton Goggins, and Grace Zabriskie. Ray McKinnon, in addition to playing the role of "Snake", directed, wrote, and produced the film. The story is about a woman named Chrystal (Lisa Blount) who has been traumatized both physically and mentally from a car accident that took the life of her son. Joe (Billy Bob Thornton), Chrystal's husband, has just been released from jail after a 16-year sentence stemming from multiple crimes he committed.

Plot
In Arkansas, a woman named Chrystal, has become permanently injured, emotionally detached, and mentally unstable stemming from several traumatic events in her past.

The movie begins with Joe fleeing from the police in a high-speed police chase with his wife and son in the same car. While weaving down the mountain roads at a high speed, Joe loses control of the vehicle and ends up rolling down a hill and, subsequently, crashing into a tree. Chrystal is severely injured in the accident, suffering a broken neck. Their son, who the police presumed was flung through the windshield, was never found at the scene of the accident, or anywhere in the surrounding areas.

For his role in running from the police and causing injuries to his passengers, Joe is arrested and sentenced to 16 years in prison for a variety of crimes, including fleeing to avoid capture by police.

Upon his release from the state prison, Joe comes back to his home in search of a change in his life. He ends up coming back home to his wife, who hadn't divorced him even while he was away in prison. Because of Joe's run-in with the law, and the resulting car accident and loss of their child, Chrystal is permanently injured in her neck that left her a quadraplegic. Although later Chrystal has managed to regain limited mobility in her body, she has completely lost her enthusiasm, emotions, or will to live.

As Joe begins to slowly work his way back into her life, she is unsure of whether to accept him once again, fearing what may happen if she does so. He now wants to change and atone for his past life of crime. Forced to face his past to continue with his future, Joe runs into an old enemy of his, Snake (Ray McKinnon). Worried about him, Snake invites Joe to rejoin him in his illegal drug operation.

Cast

 Lisa Blount as Chrystal
 Billy Bob Thornton as Joe
 Ray McKinnon as Snake
 Walton Goggins as Larry
 Harry Lennix as Kalid
 Johnny Galecki as Barry

Production 
The film was shot in the Eureka Springs, Arkansas area of the Ozark Mountains.

Critical reception
Reviews for Chrystal were generally positive. On Rotten Tomatoes, it received an 80% score based on 20 reviews, with an average score of 7 out of 10.

Kevin Crust of the Los Angeles Times gave it 3 out of 5 and wrote: "Chrystal unravels a bit toward the end as it becomes more fable-like, but the performances make it worthwhile." Variety called it "Respectable piece of work is reasonably involving if not compelling.".

Release and box office 
The movie was released in the United States on April 8, 2005. It was in theaters for 11 weeks following this on limited release. In total, the movie grossed $80,701 in total box office ticket sales. Chrystal's best weekend in box office sales came on its second weekend, where it grossed $19,074.

References

External links
 

2004 films
American drama films
Films scored by Stephen Trask
Films set in Arkansas
Films shot in Arkansas
2000s English-language films
2000s American films
Films about disability